This is a list of Canadian films which were released in the 1930s.

References

1930s
Canada
1930s in Canada